It Might as Well Be Spring is an album by American saxophonist Ike Quebec recorded in 1961 and released on the Blue Note label.

Reception
The Allmusic review by Stephen Thomas Erlewine awarded the album 3½ stars and stated "Ike Quebec recorded another winning hard bop album with It Might As Well Be Spring. In many ways, the record is a companion piece to Heavy Soul. Since the two albums were recorded so close together, it's not surprising that there a number of stylistic similarities, but there are subtle differences to savor. The main distinction between the two dates is that It Might As Well Be Spring is a relaxed, romantic date composed of standards. It provides Quebec with ample opportunity to showcase his rich, lyrical ballad style, and he shines throughout the album".

Track listing
All compositions by Ike Quebec except where noted
 "It Might as Well Be Spring" (Oscar Hammerstein II, Richard Rodgers) - 6:22
 "A Light Reprieve" - 5:25
 "Easy - Don't Hurt" - 6:08
 "Lover Man" (Jimmy Davis, Ram Ramirez, James Sherman) - 5:57
 "Ol' Man River" (Hammerstein II, Jerome Kern) - 6:37
 "Willow Weep for Me" (Ann Ronell) - 5:20

Personnel
Ike Quebec - tenor saxophone
Freddie Roach - organ
Milt Hinton - bass
Al Harewood - drums

References

Blue Note Records albums
Ike Quebec albums
1964 albums
Albums produced by Alfred Lion
Albums recorded at Van Gelder Studio